Many organizations that are not federal states are governed under a form of federalism. Typically they are organizations of organizations, that is supraorganizations.

Types of non-governmental federations include:

 International sports federation, a sports governing body
 Trades union federation
 Cooperative federation, a co-op of co-ops

List 

Notable non-governmental organizations, unions and other bodies called 'federations' include:

 International Federation of Red Cross and Red Crescent Societies
 World Wrestling Entertainment formerly known as World Wrestling Federation, a professional wrestling franchise
 International of Anarchist Federations
 International Organization for Standardization (ISO), previously known as the International Federation of the National Standardizing Associations (ISA)
 International Measurement Confederation, a metrology body
 International Federation for Human Rights
 American Federation of Teachers
 National Wildlife Federation in the USA
 Community Health Charities of America
 ILGA, International Lesbian, Gay, Bisexual, Trans and Intersex Association

See also 
 Organizational structure
 :Category:Federations
 :Category:Supraorganizations